Fingers is a 1978 American crime drama film directed by James Toback. The film is about a troubled young man being pulled between his mob father and his mentally disturbed pianist mother.

Plot

Jimmy "Fingers" Angelelli (Harvey Keitel) is a brilliant young pianist who also works as a debt collector for his father Ben (Michael V. Gazzo), a local loan shark. Wherever Jimmy goes, he always carries a tape player with him, playing classic pop hits (mainly soul and R'n'B) from the 1950s and 1960s. While trying to concentrate on an upcoming recital interview at Carnegie Hall, Jimmy loses focus when he falls for a woman named Carol (Tisa Farrow). He gets further sidetracked when collecting a large debt from a mafioso named Riccamonza (Tony Sirico), who eventually threatens Ben's life. This forces Jimmy to seek retribution.

Cast
 Harvey Keitel as Jimmy "Fingers"
 Tisa Farrow as Carol
 Michael V. Gazzo as Ben Angelelli
 Jim Brown as "Dreems"
 Tanya Roberts as Julie
 Marian Seldes as Ruth
 Danny Aiello as Butch
 Ed Marinaro as Gino
 Tony Sirico as Riccamonza
 Dominic Chianese as Arthur Fox
 Largo Woodruff as Dreems' Girl
 Sam Coppola as Sam

Production
James Toback said he originally wanted Robert de Niro to play the lead, but then decided to use de Niro's best friend Harvey Keitel. "Harvey agreed to play Jimmy and quickly began to astonish me by taking the character into dimensions of darkness well beyond my original imagining", wrote Toback.

Influence
The film was remade in 2005 in France as The Beat That My Heart Skipped.

The movie is referenced by the John Travolta character Chili Palmer in the 1995 movie Get Shorty.

Music
Two notable pieces from the film are "Angel of the Morning" by Merrilee Rush and "Summertime, Summertime" by The Jamies. Director Toback initially wanted to use the song "Summertime" because the movie had "a summertime feel to it", and they wanted to shoot it during the summer months. The whole film, however, is framed by the music of Johann Sebastian Bach's Toccata in E minor (BWV 914), which Keitel's character plays throughout the film, including during his audition at Carnegie Hall.

References

External links
 

1978 films
Films set in New York City
Films directed by James Toback
American neo-noir films
1978 crime drama films
1978 directorial debut films
Films about pianos and pianists
1970s English-language films
1970s American films